RNA-binding protein Musashi homolog 1 also known as Musashi-1 is a protein that in humans is encoded by the MSI1 gene.

Function 

This gene encodes a protein containing two conserved tandem RNA recognition motifs and functions as an RNA binding protein that is involved in post-transcriptional gene editing.  It is a stem cell marker that controls the balance between self-renewal and terminal differentiation.

Clinical significance 

Over expression of this gene is associated with the grade of the malignancy and proliferative activity in gliomas and melanomas. An increased expression of MSI1 protein is observed in endometriosis and endometrial carcinoma siRNA-mediated inhibition of MSI expression in endometrial carcinoma cells induces apoptosis and inhibits cell proliferation by affecting the Notch signaling pathway

MSI1 is highly expressed in neural progenitor cells and is required for normal development of the brain. A mutation in these gene is responsible for autosomal recessive primary microcephaly. MSI1 also interacts with the Zika virus genome and may explain why these cells are highly susceptible to Zika virus infection.

See also 
 Musashi-2

References

Further reading 

 
 
 
 
 
 
 
 
 
 
 
 

RNA-binding proteins